Squads for the 1960 AFC Asian Cup played in South Korea.

South Korea

Head coach: Kim Yong-sik

Israel

Head coach:  Gyula Mándi

South Vietnam

Head coach: Lê Hữu Đức

Republic of China

Head coach: Lee Wai Tong (李惠堂) and Chu Kuo-Lun

References

External links
https://web.archive.org/web/20140102194024/http://rdfc.com.ne.kr/int/skor-intres-1960.html

AFC Asian Cup squads